Isabella Castillo Díaz (born 23 December 1994) is a Cuban actress and singer. Her best known role is that of Graciela "Grachi" Alonso, main character of the Nickelodeon Latin America's series Grachi, for which has released several songs.

Biography and career 
Isabella Castillo was born on 23 December 1994, daughter of the singer Delia Díaz de Villegas and the percussionist José Castillo. She has an elder sister, Giselle, a pianist and music teacher. In 1997, at the age of three, she emigrated to Belize, moving to Miami, Florida, some months later. At the age of five she debuted as a singer in one of her mother's concerts: from that moment, she took dancing, singing and acting lessons, studying music at Musical Procenter and winning four times the Grand Prize at the Youth Fair of the Florida International University. On 26 March 2005 she won the first prize as Most Promising in the Children Singing Division at the USA World Showcase and on 15 July she took the stage on the Manuel Artime Theater in Miami in the musical Fantasia en Disney; she also participated in the contest Best New Talent in Los Angeles and in the concert offered by the Israeli Embassy for Cuban people living in the USA. In 2007 she gained the Magnet Outstanding Performance recognition at the South Miami Middle Community School and she was invited to honor the neo-elected president of Israel Shimon Peres. Again in 2007, persuaded by the producer Óscar Gómez, she started an intensive course of acting with the Cuban actress Lili Rentería, preparing for the audition in Madrid for the musical El diario de Ana Frank – Un canto a la vida; moving in Spain with her family, after three rounds of auditions she was given the main role. The musical, which opened on 28 February 2008, won her the Gran Via Award as Best Revelation in a Musical.

Back in the United States in 2009, she began her acting career in the telenovela produced by Telemundo El Fantasma de Elena, in which she played the seventeen-year-old girl Andrea Girón; at the end of the series, she got the role of Grachi, the main character of the homonymous telenovela of Nickelodeon Latinoamérica. During the broadcast, in February 2012, of the second of three seasons, Castillo participated in the musical Grachi: El show en vivo. Thanks to Grachi, between 2011 and 2012 Castillo won the Favorite Actress award at Kids' Choice Awards México, Kids' Choice Awards Argentina and Meus Prêmios Nick, becoming also the first to win the Favorite Latin Artist award at Kids' Choice Awards 2012.

On 21 February 2013 she signed with Warner Music Latina for her first album, Soñar no Cuesta Nada, released on 23 April. In March she won the Favorite Latin Artist Award at Kids' Choice Awards for the second time. In September 2014, singer Patricio Arellano published his third album, featuring a duet with Castillo titled "Que duermas conmigo", and on 21 October, she was announced in the cast of the new telenovela Tierra de reyes with the dual role of Alma Gallardo and Verónica Saldívar. She then starred in another telenovela, ¿Quién es quién?; meanwhile, she acted in Araceli Álvarez de Sotomayor's Tacones enanos, a Spanish theater play, from 9 December 2015 to 10 January 2016.

Filmography

Discography

Albums

Awards and nominations

References

External links 

 

1994 births
Living people
Cuban television actresses
Cuban television presenters
Cuban women television presenters
Musicians from Havana
Women in Latin music
21st-century Cuban women singers